Bakhodir Jalolov is an Uzbekistani professional boxer who won a bronze medal at the 2015 World Championships, and gold at the 2019 World Championships and 2020 Summer Olympics. He also competed at the 2016 Summer Olympics, and acted as Uzbekistan's flag bearer at both games.

Amateur career

Asian championships
Jalolov took part in the 2017 Asian Amateur Boxing Championships, held in May 2017 in Tashkent, Uzbekistan. He went on a perfect 4–0 run, beating Haipeng Mou and Do Hyeon Kim by technical knockout in the first two rounds, Mohamad Mulayes by technical knockout in the semifinals, and Kamshybek Kunkabayev by majority decision in the finals.

Jalolov went on another perfect run in the 2019 Asian Amateur Boxing Championships, and earned his place in the finals after beating Mohamad Mulayes by unanimous decision in the semifinals. Jalolov faced a familiar opponent in the finals, Kamshybek Kunkabayev, and won the fight by majority decision.

Jalolov took part in the 2021 Asian Amateur Boxing Championships as well, and earned his place in the finals with a technical knockout of Abdulrahman Alanzi in the semifinals. He faced Kamshybek Kunkabayev in the tournament finals, and once again prevailed against Kunkabayev, winning by unanimous decision.

World championships
Bakhodir Jalolov participated in the 2015 AIBA World Boxing Championships, held in Doha, Qatar in October 2015. He earned his place in the semifinals with decision wins against Mohamed Grimes, Lenier Pero and Hussein Iashaish. Jalolov lost his semifinal bout against Ivan Dychko by split decision.

After an unsuccessful run in the 2017 AIBA World Boxing Championships, where he was eliminated in the second round by Kamshybek Kunkabayev, Jalolov next found success in the 2019 AIBA World Boxing Championships. After beating Tsotne Rogava by decision in the first round, Richard Torrez by knockout in the second round and Maxim Babanin by decision in the semifinals. Jalolov faced Kamshybek Kunkabayev in the finals and beat him by unanimous decision.

Olympic games
Jalolov reached quarterfinals at the 2016 Summer Olympics, where he lost to the eventual silver medalist Joe Joyce. He qualified for the 2020 Summer Olympics and was set to face Mahammad Abdullayev in the first round of the super heavyweight tournament. He thoroughly outboxed Abdullayev over three rounds and scored a standing eight count in round two, although he was unable to finish his opponent. Jalolov advanced to the tournament quarterfinals, where he faced Satish Kumar, whom he beat by unanimous decision. Advancing to the semifinals, Jalolov fought Frazer Clarke. Although Clarke was able to force a standing count, the fight was stopped in the third round due to a previously sustained cut above his eye which widened throughout his bout with Jalolov. Jalolov earned the gold medal after beating Richard Torrez by unanimous decision in the finals of the super heavyweight tournament.

Professional career
Jalolov made his professional debut against Hugo Trujillo on 5 May 2018. He won the fight by a third-round technical knockout. Jalolov scored another stoppage victory four months later, on 29 September 2018, when he knocked Eduardo Vitela out in the first round. Jalolov was next scheduled to face Tyrell Wright at the Madison Square Garden on 27 October 2018. He won the fight by stoppage, after Wright retired from the fight at the end of the fourth round. Jalolov was scheduled to fight Marquis Valentine on 8 December 2018, in his last fight of the year. He scored the second first-round stoppage of his professional career, knocking Valentine out at the 2:29 minute mark of the opening round.

Jalolov was next scheduled to face Willie Harvey on 15 March 2019. He won the fight by a second-round technical knockout. Jalolov fought for his first professional title on 10 April 2019, when he took on Brendan Barrett for the vacant WBC-NABF Junior heavyweight title. He won the fight by a first-round knockout.

Jalolov returned on 12 December 2020, to fight Wilfredo Leal. Leal retired from the bout at the end of the first round. Jalolov fought in his native Uzbekistan on 3 April 2021, when he was scheduled to fight Kristaps Zutis. He beat Zutis by a second-round technical knockout. Jalolov knocked out Kamil Sokolowski in the fifth round on 18 March 2022.

Jalolov returned to the United States to face Jack Mulowayi on 10 June 2022. He won the fight by an eight-round knockout, flooring Mulowayi with a left hook. Jalolov knocked his opponent down with a left hook in the sixth round as well, and was deducted a point in the fourth round for excessive holding.

Jalolov faced the veteran Curtis Harper on 26 November 2022. He won the fight by a fourth-round knockout, after having knocked Harper down twice prior to the stoppage.

Professional boxing record

References

External links
 

Year of birth missing (living people)
Living people
Uzbekistani male boxers
Olympic boxers of Uzbekistan
Boxers at the 2016 Summer Olympics
Super-heavyweight boxers
World boxing champions
AIBA World Boxing Championships medalists
Boxers at the 2020 Summer Olympics
Medalists at the 2020 Summer Olympics
Olympic medalists in boxing
Olympic gold medalists for Uzbekistan
21st-century Uzbekistani people